The following outline is provided as an overview of and topical guide to dinosaurs:

Dinosaurs – diverse group of animals of the clade and superorder Dinosauria. They were the dominant terrestrial vertebrates for over 160 million years, from the late Triassic period (about in 1963) until the end of the Cretaceous (2000), when the Cretaceous–Paleogene extinction event led to the extinction of all non-avian dinosaurs at the close of the Mesozoic era.

Birds evolved within theropod dinosaurs during the Jurassic period. Some survived the Cretaceous–Paleogene extinction event, including the ancestors of all modern birds, and birds are the only dinosaurs which survived to the present day. The outline of birds covers these avian dinosaurs.

Types of dinosaurs 

 Feathered dinosaur

By period 
 Paleocene dinosaurs

By region 
 List of African dinosaurs
 List of Asian dinosaurs
 Australian and Antarctic dinosaurs
 List of Australian and Antarctic dinosaurs
 South Polar dinosaurs
 Dinosaurs of New Zealand
 List of European dinosaurs
 List of Indian and Madagascan dinosaurs
 List of North American dinosaurs
 List of Appalachian dinosaurs
 List of South American dinosaurs

Dinosaur fossils 

 Fossil
 Ichnotaxon
 Ichnites
 List of dinosaur ichnogenera
 Lists of dinosaur specimens
 List of stratigraphic units with dinosaur tracks
 List of dinosaur-bearing rock formations
 List of stratigraphic units with dinosaur body fossils
 List of stratigraphic units with dinosaur trace fossils
 List of stratigraphic units with few dinosaur genera
 List of stratigraphic units with indeterminate dinosaur fossils

Fields that study dinosaurs 
 Vertebrate paleontology
 Phylogenetics

History of dinosaurs 
 Evolution of dinosaurs –
 History of paleontology – history of the study of the fossil record.
 Dinosaur renaissance – a period of renewed interest in dinosaurs, and a shift in the scientific consensus about them.
 Prehistoric reptiles – broad category that is intended to help distinguish the dinosaurs from other prehistoric reptiles. Dinosaurs, because of their long and successful reign for many millions of years, are almost exclusively dealt with in their own category of prehistoric life. Therefore, this category covers all the non-dinosaurian reptiles which are often erroneously considered to be dinosaurs, such as the seafaring varieties of plesiosaurs and the flying pterosaurs.

Biology of dinosaurs 
 Age determination in dinosaurs
 Dinosaur coloration
 Dinosaur intelligence
 Physiology of dinosaurs
 Dinosaur reproduction
 Dinosaur egg
 Dinosaur senses
 Dinosaur vision

Dinosaur anatomy 
 Antorbital fenestra
 Arctometatarsal
 Armour (anatomy)
 Claw
 Club (anatomy)
 Coracoid tubercle
 Crop (anatomy)
 Epoccipital
 Furcula
 Gastralium
 Gizzard
 Horn (anatomy)
 Infratemporal fenestra
 Interdental plate
 Manus (anatomy)
 Neck frill
 Obturator process
 Osteoderm
 Palpebral (bone)
 Pes (anatomy)
 Predentary
 Proximodorsal process
 Rostral bone
 Sclerotic ring
 Scute
 Synsacrum
 Thagomizer

Dinosaur psychology 
 Dinosaur behavior
 Dinosaur intelligence

Dinosaur resources 
 Album of Dinosaurs (book)
 Walking with Dinosaurs (documentary)

Dinosaurs in culture 

 Cultural depictions of dinosaurs
 Dragons versus dinosaurs
 Dinosaurs in popular media
 Fictional dinosaurs
 Barney & Friends
 Living dinosaur
 List of dinosaur parks
 List of U.S. state dinosaurs
 Sites of fossilized dinosaurs across the southern South Korean coast

Animals commonly mistaken as dinosaurs 
 Pterosaurs (also known as pterodactyls))
 Extinct marine reptiles, such as:
  Ichthyosaurs
 Plesiosaurs
 Mosasaurs

Persons influential in dinosaurs 
 List of paleontologists

See also 

 Outline of birds

References

External links 

Dinosaurs
Dinosaurs